Zubarev or Zubareva (feminine) is a common Russian surname. Notable people with the surname include:

Andrei Zubarev (born 1987), Russian ice hockey player
Dmitry Zubarev (1917–1992), Russian theoretical physicist
Nikolai Zubarev (1894–1951), Russian chess master
Viktor Zubarev (1973–2004), Kazakhstani footballer
Viktor Zubarev (politician) (born 1961), Russian politician
Roman Zubarev (born 1963), Russian-Swedish scientist

Russian-language surnames